Shankar Subbanarasayya Mantha, commonly known as S. S. Mantha, is an Indian academician and administrator based in Mumbai, Maharashtra, currently serving as the CEO of MahaPreit StartUp Knowledge Centre (MSKC), Mumbai and Adjunct professor of National Institute of Advanced Studies, Bangalore. He is also the former Chairman of All India Council for Technical Education (AICTE), a statutory body and a national level council for technical education under the Department of Higher Education established in 1945, and has served as president of the National Board of Accreditation and deputy vice-chancellor of the SNDT Women's University, Mumbai. He also served as the chancellor of KL University. He heads the National Technical Committee, National Cyber Safety, and Security Standards (NSSSC).

He has been awarded the Honorary Doctorate Degree, Doctor of Science (Honoris Causa) by Visvesvaraya Technological University, Karnataka in 2012 and by D Y Patil International University, Maharashtra in 2014.

Early life 
Mantha was born and grew up in Mumbai, Maharashtra. He graduated with a bachelor's degree in mechanical engineering from Maharaja Sayajirao University of Baroda and earned a master's degree in mechanical engineering from VJTI, Mumbai.

He also holds a PhD in combustion modeling from the University of Mumbai.

Career 
Mantha, who was the vice chairman at All India Council for Technical Education, was given the additional charge of chairman in 2009, when the then chairman RA Yadav was suspended by the Union HRD ministry due to corruption charges. Mantha was later appointed as the chairman of AICTE in 2012, where he spent six years conceiving and implementing e-governance reforms to allow for a transparent administration and created the regulations for the Blended Learning Paradigm and the regulations for Twinning Programs in Engineering and Technology.

Mantha was Professor of Robotics and Artificial Intelligence in the Department of Mechanical Engineering at Veermata Jijabai Technological Institute. On his retirement, he continued to serve VJTI as professor emeritus.

He has advised the National e-governance division (NeGD) and the Government of Maharashtra on IT initiatives including the Citizen Facilitation Centre of Kalyan Dombivli Municipal Corporation and contributed to Indian accreditation system to be a part of the Washington accord.

He was instrumental in creating the National Vocational Education Qualification Framework which was later re-christened the National Skill Qualification Framework (NSQF).

He has more than 280 publications in national and international journals and conference proceedings and has contributed over 250 articles on education and administration to publications, including The Indian Express, LiveMint, Lokmat, and Businessworld, among others

Awards and recognition 
2021

 Awarded the Lal Bahadur Shastri Exemplar for integrity by ReThink India Foundation

2020

 IEEE Robotics and Automation Society, Senior Member

2014

 Received SKOCH Award for e-Governance initiatives at AICTE, 2014.

2013-2014

 Received Lifetime Achievement Award in the field of Education from SOE Global Education Awards, 2013–2014.

2011

 Received the 5th National Telecom Awards for Excellence in Education through e-governance from CMAI and Star News in 2011

2002

 Awarded the Best Teacher Award of Maharashtra from the Government of Maharashtra in 2002

Publications

Books 

 Object Oriented Programming in C++ (22 August 2009), 
 Aerodynamics of Cars: An Experimental Investigation - A Synergy of Wind Tunnel & CFD (30 December 2011), 
 Design and Development of Decelerometer (9 August 2012),

Technical Articles 

 Design, modeling and simulation of a reconfigurable wheelchair with stand-sit-sleep facilities, 5th International Conference on Mechanics and Mechatronics Research (ICMMR 2018), 
 India Envelope Insulation for Energy Efficient Smart Buildings, The International Journal of Innovative Technology and Exploring Engineering (September 2019)
 Stability Analysis of Various Lengths Conical Hydrodynamic Bearing for Variable Load Conditions, International Conference on Advances in Thermal Systems, Materials and Design Engineering (ATSMDE2017), 
 Orifice Compensated Performance Characteristics of Hybrid Hole-entry Conical Journal Bearing, Journal of Engineering Tribology, SAGE Journals
 Optimized Design of Feeding System for Complex Steel (CF8) Investment Casting to Improve Quality and Productivity, International Conference on Advances in Thermal Systems, Materials and Design Engineering (ATSMDE2017), 
 Effect of Aspect Ratio and Semi Cone Angle on the Stability Behaviour of a Conical Hydrodynamic Journal Bearing, International Conference on Advances in Thermal Systems, Materials and Design Engineering, 
 Effect of aspect ratio and semi cone angle on the stability behavior of a conical hydrodynamic Journal bearing, International Conference on Advances in Thermal Systems, Materials & Design Engineering (ATSMDE2017), 
 Promoting quality of life of disabled people through comprehensive needs assessment study and QFD deployment targeted at evidence based wheelchair design, Springer Journals, Iranian Rehabilitation Journal

References

External links 
 Dr. S S Mantha
 Official website
 Dr S S Mantha Speaks

Living people
1954 births
People from Mumbai
Academic staff of Veermata Jijabai Technological Institute
Heads of universities and colleges in India